Phalonidia dysodona is a species of moth of the family Tortricidae. It is found in China (Heilongjiang) and Russia. The habitat consists of wet meadows and mesic grasslands.

Adults have been recorded on wing from May to August.

References

Moths described in 1916
Phalonidia